The National Irish Famine Museum is a museum located at Strokestown Park, Roscommon, Ireland. The museum contains records from the time of Ireland's Great Famine of 1845–1852. The museum was built by the Westward Group and all the documents on display in the museum are from the estate. The exhibit aims to explain the Great Irish Famine and to draw parallels with the occurrence of famine in the world today.

The National Famine Museum is twinned with the Grosse Isle and the Irish Memorial National Historic Site in Quebec, Canada.

References

External links
 

Buildings and structures in County Roscommon
Great Famine (Ireland) museums
Museums in County Roscommon
Potato museums